Fuscidea is a genus of crustose lichens in the family Fuscideaceae. It has about 40 species. The genus was circumscribed in 1972 by lichenologists Volkmar Wirth and Antonín Vězda, with Fuscidea aggregatilis assigned as the type species.

Species

Fuscidea aleutica 
Fuscidea appalachensis  – Appalachian Mountains of Northeastern North America
Fuscidea arboricola 
Fuscidea asbolodes 
Fuscidea austera 
Fuscidea australis 
Fuscidea coreana 
Fuscidea cyathoides 
Fuscidea elixii 
Fuscidea extremorientalis 
Fuscidea fagicola 
Fuscidea gothoburgensis 
Fuscidea intercincta 
Fuscidea kochiana 
Fuscidea lightfootii 
Fuscidea lygaea 
Fuscidea maccarthyi 
Fuscidea mayrhoferi 
Fuscidea mollis 
Fuscidea multispora  – Bolivia
Fuscidea muskeg  – Alaska
Fuscidea oceanica 
Fuscidea praeruptorum 
Fuscidea pusilla 
Fuscidea ramboldioides 
Fuscidea recensa 
Fuscidea scrupulosa 
Fuscidea stiriaca 
Fuscidea subasbolodes 
Fuscidea texana  – Texas
Fuscidea tropica

References

Umbilicariales
Lichen genera
Lecanoromycetes genera
Taxa described in 1972
Taxa named by Antonín Vězda